Hanacaraka is the native name for the following indigenous scripts used in Indonesia:
The Balinese script
The Javanese script
The Sundanese script